Ragnel Rose-Marie Huuva (born 13 July 1943, Rensjön, Gabna Sami village, Kiruna Municipality) is a Swedish Sámi visual and textile artist, as well as a poet. As a poet, she first became published in magazines and anthologies in 1981. Her lyrical breakthrough occurred in 1999 with the poetry collection Galbma Radna ("Cold comrade"). She was nominated for the Nordic Council's Literature Prize in 2001. In 2003 she was awarded the Cultural Scholarship Rubus arcticus.

Beside Swedish her poems were also translated to Icelandic and Finnish as well as German.

Bibliography 
Rose-Marie Huuva: Galbma rádná, DAT, Guovdageaidnu 1999,  
Rose-Marie Huuva: Kall kamrat, DAT, Guovdageaidnu 2001) 
Rose-Marie Huuva, Inghilda Tapio, Inghilda, Thomas Marainen and Simon Marainen: Viidát: divttat Sámis / Vidd: dikter från Sápmi, Podium, Stockholm 2006,  
Rose-Marie Huuva: Li mihkkege leat, DAT, Guovdageaidnu 2006,  
Rose-Marie Huuva: Mjukt smeker molnets rand, Podium, Stockholm 2011)

See also
List of Nordic Council's Literature Prize winners and nominees

References

1943 births
Living people
People from Kiruna Municipality
Swedish women poets
Swedish textile artists
Swedish Sámi-language writers
Writers from Lapland (Sweden)
Swedish women artists
Women textile artists